Tinci Materials (officially Guangzhou Tinci Materials Technology Co., Ltd.), simply known as Tinci, is a Chinese cosmetics materials manufacturer founded by Xu Jinfu in 2000. The company primarily involves in the R&D and production of new fine chemical materials, especially specializing in the producing of electrolytes. Additionally, the company also makes battery materials and specialty chemicals.

Tinci Materials stepped into the lithium battery electrolyte industry in 2002. In 2011, it became a supplier to Procter & Gamble. The company went public on the Shenzhen Stock Exchange on January 23, 2014, with the stock symbol "002709.SZ".

Tinci Materials forged a partnership with Lanxess in March 2021, and starting the following year, its electrolyte formulations will be produced at a plant in Leverkusen, Germany. In May, it signed a supply agreement with CATL.

References 

Chinese companies established in 2000
Companies based in Guangzhou
2014 initial public offerings
Companies listed on the Shenzhen Stock Exchange